Schlagintweit is a surname. Notable persons with that surname include:

 A German family of 5 brothers, all explorers and scholars:
Hermann Schlagintweit (1826–1882), German explorer of Central Asia
Adolf Schlagintweit (1829–1857)
Eduard Schlagintweit (1831–1866)
Robert Schlagintweit (1833–1885)
Emil Schlagintweit (1835–1904)